John Isner and Sam Querrey were the defending champions, but they lost to Kevin Anderson and Ashley Fisher in the quarterfinals.
Max Mirnyi and Daniel Nestor won this tournament. They defeated Eric Butorac and Jean-Julien Rojer 6–2, 6–7(6–8), [10–3] in the final.

Seeds

Draw

Draw

External links
 Main Draw

Regions Morgan Keegan Championships - Doubles
2011 Regions Morgan Keegan Championships and the Cellular South Cup